William Welsh may refer to:
William Welsh (RAF officer) (1891–1962), British Royal Air Force officer
Willie Welsh (1907–1987), Scottish rugby player
William Welsh (actor) (1870–1946), American actor
William Welsh (Canadian politician) (1822–1905), merchant, ship owner and politician in Prince Edward Island
William Welsh (footballer) (fl. 1919–20), footballer for Grimsby Town
William P. Welsh (1889–1984), American muralist, portrait painter, and illustrator
William Halliday Welsh (1879–1972), Scottish rugby union player
Bill Welsh (1911–2000), American television announcer
Bill Welsh (footballer, born 1908) (1908–1987), Australian rules footballer for Geelong
Bill Welsh (footballer, born 1924) (1924–2019), Australian rules footballer for Collingwood
William Welsh, brother of John Welsh

See also
William Welch (disambiguation)
Bill Walsh (disambiguation)
William Walsh (disambiguation)